Jim Donovan (born 1964 in Quebec) is a Canadian TV director and film director.  He wrote and directed 3 saisons, which won several international awards, including Best Feature at the 2010 Beverly Hills Film Festival, Best Director at the 2009 Mexico International Film Festival, and Best Canadian Feature Film at the 2008 Whistler Film Festival.

Background
He received a 2005 Directors Guild of Canada nomination for Pure, his first feature film. He relocated from Montreal to Toronto in early 2010, and founded Undertow Entertainment in 2011.  In 2013 Donovan was presented with a Canadian Screen Award for best director for his work on the television series Flashpoint. In 2014 Donovan was nominated for a Directors Guild of Canada award for Best Drama Television Series, for the program Cracked; Ghost Dance.

Partial filmography

Films
2 Mayhem 3, 1996
Agent Provocateur, 1997
Pure, 2005
The Watch, 2008
3 Seasons (3 Saisons), 2009
The Perfect Teacher, 2010
Believe Me: The Abduction of Lisa McVey, 2018

Television series
Cracked - seasons 1 and 2
Are You Afraid of the Dark? - season 5
Instant Star- seasons 2 and 3
Flashpoint - season 4, 5, 7

References

External links 
 

"Profile at Directors Guild of Canada".

Canadian television directors
Film directors from Quebec
Living people
1964 births
Place of birth missing (living people)
Canadian Screen Award winners